The Minister of Tourism in New Zealand is the cabinet member appointed by the Prime Minister to be in charge of Tourism New Zealand. The current Minister of Tourism is Stuart Nash.

Background
The office was created in 1906 as Minister for Tourist and Health Resorts. In 1935 the post was renamed Minister for Tourist and Publicity before finally becoming Minister of Tourism in 1963. In 1966 it became a full cabinet level portfolio. Historically the Minister of Tourism was the lowest ranking position in cabinet in the 1960s and 1970s, though its prominence has risen in more recent years, with Kelvin Davis being ranked 3rd in cabinet and the deputy leader of the governing Labour Party.

List of ministers
The following ministers have held the office of Minister of Tourism.

Key

Notes

References

Tourism
Political office-holders in New Zealand